Invaders from Mars is a 1953 independently made American SuperCinecolor science fiction film directed by William Cameron Menzies and starring Jimmy Hunt, Helena Carter, Arthur Franz, Morris Ankrum, Leif Erickson, and Hillary Brooke. It was produced by Edward L. Alperson Jr and was distributed by Twentieth Century-Fox.

Awakened during a thunderstorm, youngster David MacLean witnesses a brightly lit flying saucer disappear underground in the large sand pit behind his home. When his father investigates, he returns a changed man; soon David's mother, a young neighbor girl, and others, begin to act in the same way. Begging the police for help, David's panicked story is heard by Dr. Pat Blake, who takes him to astronomer Dr. Stuart Kelston. David soon convinces Kelston, who comes to believe that this is an invading vanguard from Mars.

Invaders from Mars recounts its story from the point of view of an older child in an adult world heading into crisis. It was developed from a scenario by Richard Blake and based on a story treatment by John Tucker Battle, who was inspired by a dream recounted to him by his wife. The film was rushed into production to show in theaters before George Pal's War of the Worlds (also 1953), becoming the first feature film to show aliens and their spacecraft in color.

Plot

Late one night, youngster David MacLean is awakened by a loud thunderstorm. From his bedroom window, he sees a large flying saucer descend and disappear into the sandpit area behind his home. After rushing to tell his parents, his scientist father goes to investigate David's claim. When his father returns much later in the morning, David notices an unusual red puncture along the hairline on the back of his father's neck; his father is now behaving in a cold and hostile manner. David soon begins to realize that something is very wrong: he notices that certain townsfolk are acting in exactly the same way. Through his telescope, David sees child neighbor Kathy Wilson suddenly disappear underground while walking in the sandpit. David flees to the police station for help and is eventually placed under the protection of health-department physician Dr. Pat Blake, who slowly begins to believe his crazy story.

With the help of local astronomer Dr. Stuart Kelston and Dr. Blake, David soon realizes that the flying saucer is likely the vanguard of an invasion from the planet Mars, now in close orbital proximity to Earth. Dr. Kelston contacts the U.S. Army and convinces them to immediately investigate: An important government rocket research plant is located nearby. In short order, the Pentagon assembles troops and tanks under the command of Colonel Fielding. An alien sabotage plot at the plant is soon uncovered, leading back to the sandpit, and the army surrounds the saucer landing site.

Standing well away from the army search, Dr. Blake and young David are suddenly sucked underground. They are captured by two tall, slit-eyed green humanoids and taken via tunnels to the flying saucer. Army troops locate and blow open an entrance to the tunnels, and Colonel Fielding and a small detachment make their way to the saucer entrance. Inside, they confront the Martian mastermind: It has a giant green head with a humanoid face atop a small, green partial torso with several green arm-tentacles, and is encased in a transparent sphere. The Martian is served by the tall, green, silent, synthetic mutants. Under their master's mental commands, the mute humanoids have implanted mind-control crystals at the base of the skull of their kidnapped victims, forcing them to attempt sabotage at an atomic rocket project being built at a military plant near the town; if they are caught, the mind control devices explode, causing a fatal cerebral hemorrhage. The troops and Colonel Fielding, with Dr. Blake and David in tow, open fire on the pursuing mutants as their group escapes the saucer. After a short running battle in the tunnels, they return to the surface. Orders are given for everyone to quickly leave the area: Fielding's troops have planted timed explosive charges aboard the saucer. David runs downhill away from the sandpit, and artillery opens fire on the sandpit, as the charges' ticking timer slowly approaches zero.

Following the large explosion, David is suddenly back in his bed during a thunder and lightning storm. He runs into his parents' bedroom, confused and frightened; they reassure him that he was just having a bad dream, telling him to go back to sleep. Having returned to his bed, more wind and loud thunder is heard. David climbs out of bed again, goes to his window, and witnesses the very same flying saucer in his nightmare slowly descending into the sandpit, to which he responds, "Gee whiz!"

Cast

Starring:
 Jimmy Hunt as David MacLean
 Arthur Franz as Dr. Stuart Kelston
 Helena Carter as Dr. Patricia Blake

Featuring:
 Leif Erickson as George MacLean
 Hillary Brooke as Mary MacLean
 Morris Ankrum as Col. Fielding
 Walter Sande as Police Sgt. Mack Finlay
 Max Wagner as Army Sgt. Rinaldi
 Milburn Stone as Army Capt. Roth
 Douglas Kennedy as Police Officer Jackson
 Charles Cane as Police Officer Blaine
 Bert Freed as Police Chief A.C. Barrows
 Fay Baker as Mrs. Wilson
 Janine Perreau as Kathy Wilson
 John Eldredge as Mr. Turner
 Charles Gibb as Lt. Blair
 Gil Herman as Maj. Clary
 Bill Phipps as Sgt. Baker
 Luce Potter as the Martian in Glass Globe
 Lock Martin as Mutant Martian Guard
 Max Palmer as Mutant Martian Guard

With:
 Barbara Billingsley as Kelston's Secretary
 Todd Karns as Jim, Gas Station Attendant
 Robert Shayne as Dr. William Wilson
 Frank Wilcox as Pentagon Chief of Staff
 William Forrest as Gen. Mayberry
 Richard Deacon as M.P. Confirming Gen. Mayberry's Identity

Production

Casting
This was the first time in Helena Carter's career that she played something other than the romantic interest for the male lead. She retired from acting after this film was completed.

Music
The production makes use of a unique outre music score that consists of an ethereal, rhythmically wavering tonal composition sung in unison by a choir. It is used as both a sound effect and as the scenic score associated with the Martians. As the film's "The End" title card and end credits are displayed, the ethereal music underscores an unspoken question that only each viewer can answer: is young David still asleep, trapped in a recurring nightmare, or was his bad dream a premonition of this now real event? The score is credited to Raoul Kraushaar, but Thomas Hischak's Encyclopedia of Film Composers notes that most of the score is now believed to be the work of frequent Republic composer Mort Glickman.

Visual design
An Eastmancolor camera negative was used for principal photography, with SuperCinecolor prints struck for the initial theatrical release to provide an oddly striking and vivid look to the film's images; standard Eastmancolor prints were used thereafter on later releases. While some film sources have claimed that Invaders was designed for the early 3D process (it was already in production before the breakthrough 3D film, Bwana Devil, was released), it was not filmed or released in 3D.

Despite being a quickly shot, low-budget 1950s feature, Invaders uses occasional camera angles set lower or higher than usual to enhance the dramatic and visual impact of key scenes. Some of Menzies' set designs (such as those in the police station, the observatory, and the interiors of the Martian flying saucer) consist of elongated structures with stark, unadorned walls, sometimes much taller than necessary, adding touches of dreamlike surrealism.

Special effects
The Martian heat-ray effect showing the bubbling, melting walls of the tunnels was created by shooting a large tub of boiling oatmeal from above, colored red with food coloring and lit with red lights. The cooled, bubbled-up effect on some areas of the blasted tunnel walls was created by first using inflated balloons pinned to the tunnel walls. In film tests they looked like balloons stuck to the walls, so the effects crew tried smaller inflated latex condoms. Further testing showed these looked much more convincing, and the crew wound up inflating more than 3,000 and then sticking them to portions of the tunnel set's walls; in some shots, the condoms can be seen moving slightly as the Martian mutants rush down the tunnels.

The film was shot at Republic Pictures in the conventional (pre-CinemaScope) 1.37:1 screen aspect ratio, thereby facilitating recycling shots simply by flipping the film negative left to right (or right to left) in an optical printer, as "full aperture" is symmetric about the film's axis. These effects shots in Invaders are apparent. For example, during the car chase scenes, where cars are first seen turning one way and, several cuts later, the very same cars are seen turning the opposite direction (with identical, but reversed background). "Full aperture" also facilitated shooting the sandpit scenes (sand "falling down" or sand "falling up") without resorting to an optical printer stepping backwards. This was done by the simple expedient of shooting the "falling down" scenes conventionally, but shooting the "falling up" scenes with the camera upside-down, rotated about the optical axis of the lens, and then reversing that shot end-for-end during "negative assembly", making the sand appear to be moving upwards. SuperCinecolor required an optical printer to extract the "separations". This was necessary for its three-color process: red/"cyan printer" and green/"magenta printer" printed on opposite sides of the film print, and blue/"yellow printer" printed over one of those sides, with one side having two colors, and the other side having one color. This was unlike "three-strip" Technicolor, where all three colors were printed on one side of the film stock. An interesting side effect of this process flow is that Invaders was composited as if it were a "three-strip" Technicolor feature.

British release
In 1954 the film was released in the UK. The British film distributor complained the film was not long enough and the dream narrative was not satisfactory. The producer therefore shot additional new footage to lengthen the observatory sequence, and the dream narrative was changed. A new ending and additional scenes were quickly shot in answer to the distributor's objections. Other portions of Invaders were also re-edited, while the "was-it-all-just-a-nightmare?" U.S. ending was replaced with a more straightforward conclusion. All new scenes were filmed several months after the U.S. release, including the one showing the destruction of the Martian flying saucer in the sky when the army's explosive charges finally detonate. The British release print includes a greatly expanded planetarium office scene: framed pictures can be seen hanging on the set's walls that were not in the U.S. release; they appear to vanish and then reappear at times as the expanded and reedited scenes play out. While the adult actors had not changed significantly, child actor Jimmy Hunt is taller, looks older, and has shorter hair in these added scenes. Hunt also wears a sweater vest in them (the vest materializes about three minutes into the scene, at which time Dr. Kelston's necktie also appears to be retied), while he and Dr. Kelston discuss various flying saucer accounts: the Lubbock Lights and the Mantell UFO incident; Dr. Kelston also identifies the various saucer models as "Type 1", "Type 2", etc.

British ending
The British ending removes the "dream-vs.-reality", "was-it-all-just-a-nightmare" story element: the Martian saucer exploding overhead is added shortly after David joins Kelston and Dr. Blake behind an Army tank. Dr. Blake assures him that his parents are safe now that the Martian saucer is destroyed. The scene dissolves to the MacLean house later that night, in David's bedroom, where he has been put to bed by Kelston and Dr. Blake. Standing at his door, they wish him a good night. This scene dissolves to the film's "The End" title card, as the film's ethereal music reaches its climax in coda with the final fade-out.

Critical reception
Oscar Godbout of The New York Times reviewed the film strictly as entertainment for youngsters, calling it "a pictorial 'funnybook'" that would "probably frighten witless a lot of small children". A generally positive review in Variety wrote: "Imaginative yarn makes full use of astronomical and lab equipment as well as Government atomic research installations as backgrounds to heighten the realism. Highlight, however, is a Martian ray gun which can cause the earth to part into subterranean passages. All this has been effectively filmed by John Seitz in Cinecolor". Harrison's Reports declared it "A pretty good science-fiction melodrama, photographed in Cinecolor. The story, as in most pictures of this type, is highly imaginative, but it is packed with suspense from start to finish and should thrill the action fans, especially the youngsters".

The Southern California Motion Picture Council cautioned "The tale is weird and terrifying, but well-done with ... exceptional color. ... the audience is almost frozen with fear until the finale is reached. This is entirely too terrifying and realistic a picture for children".

Film historian Paul Meehan considered Invaders from Mars as "one of the best of the 50s invasion cycle", and "in hindsight", one of the most influential of the period, setting the scene for other "abduction films". Critic Patrick Legare wrote of the film, "Originating during the science-fiction/Red-Scare boom of the '50s, Invaders From Mars is an entertaining little picture that holds up reasonably well".

Author and film critic Leonard Maltin awarded the film three out of a possible four stars. In his film review, Maltin called it "starkly stylish".

Influence
Invaders from Mars impressed some kids who grew up and became filmmakers. Don Coscarelli's original 1979 Phantasm has some plot similarities, while Brad Bird's The Iron Giant makes references to the film, as well as to other iconic science fiction features, particularly those from the 1950s.

Remake
A 1986 remake film was produced using the same title. The remake was directed by Tobe Hooper and stars Karen Black, Hunter Carson, and Timothy Bottoms. The original film's child star Jimmy Hunt played the police chief.

Adaptations
A three-issue Invaders from Mars comic book adaptation, written by Steven Philip Jones and drawn by Sandy Carruthers, was published by Eternity Comics in 1990. Eternity published an original three-issue sequel by Jones and Carruthers in 1991.

See also
List of films featuring extraterrestrials
Mars in fiction

References

Notes

Bibliography

 Clarke, Frederick S. "Invaders From Mars: A Retrospective of the Original Film". Cinefantastique magazine, Vol. 16, #3, July 1986 issue.
 Meehan, Paul. Saucer Movies: A UFOlogical History of the Cinema. Lanham, Maryland: The Scarecrow Press, 1998. .
 Miller, Thomas Kent. Mars in the Movies: A History. Jefferson, North Carolina: McFarland & Company, 2016. .
 Parrish, James Robert and Michael R. Pitts. The Great Science Fiction Pictures. Metuchen, New Jersey: The Scarecrow Press, 1977. .
 Rux, Bruce. Hollywood vs. the Aliens. London: Frog, Ltd. (North Atlantic Books), 1997. .
 Strick, Philip. Science Fiction Movies. London: Octopus Books Limited, 1976. .
 Warren, Bill. Keep Watching the Skies, American Science Fiction Movies of the 50s, Vol I: 1950–1957. Jefferson, North Carolina: McFarland & Company, 1982. .

External links

 
 
 
 Invaders from Mars – DVD Talk (Essay: part 1; part 2)
Article on making of film at Fanta Scene
Review of film at Variety

1953 films
1953 horror films
1950s science fiction horror films
20th Century Fox films
Alien invasions in films
American science fiction horror films
Articles containing video clips
Cinecolor films
Films directed by William Cameron Menzies
Mars in film
1950s science fiction films
Films scored by Raoul Kraushaar
1950s English-language films
1950s American films